Ryan Lindsay may refer:

 Ryan Lindsay (soccer), Canadian soccer player
 Ryan Lindsay (ice hockey), Canadian ice hockey player
 Ryan Lindsay (singer), Canadian country music singer